The 1963–64 Soviet Championship League season was the 18th season of the Soviet Championship League, the top level of ice hockey in the Soviet Union. 10 teams participated in the league, and CSKA Moscow won the championship.

Standings

External links 
 Season on hockeystars.ru

Soviet
Soviet League seasons